Streets of Laredo may refer to:

 "Streets of Laredo" (song), a folk music standard
 Streets of Laredo (novel), a western novel by Larry McMurtry
 The Streets of Laredo, unfinished 1948 western film directed by Ed Wood (completed and released posthumously as Crossroads of Laredo in 1995)
 Streets of Laredo (film), a 1949 western starring William Holden
 "The Streets of Laredo", 1961 short story by Will Henry 
 Streets of Laredo (miniseries), a 1995 TV adaptation of the novel, starring James Garner
 "Streets of Laredo", a four-part storyline in the 2001 The Punisher comic book series
 "The Streets of Laredo" (poem), a poem by Louis Macneice
Streets of Laredo (band), a folk-pop band of New Zealand origin based in the United States